Kailash Baitha (born 1 January 1948) is a member of the 14th Lok Sabha of India. He represents the Bagaha constituency of Bihar and is a member of the Janata Dal (United) political party.

External links
 Home Page on the Parliament of India's Website

1948 births
Living people
People from Bihar
India MPs 2004–2009
Janata Dal (United) politicians
Lok Sabha members from Bihar